Love Zombies is the second studio album by English band the Monochrome Set. It was released on 17 October 1980, through record label Dindisc.

Track listing

Critical reception 

Trouser Press described the album as possessing "a smoother and more accessible sound" than the band's debut, "Strange Boutique", praising its melodies, as well as "lyrics that take sharp, light jabs at emotional traps and social mores." AllMusic praised the album, writing that it "features more accomplished songwriting" than the group's previous work.

Personnel
Credits adapted from the album's liner notes.

The Monochrome Set
Bid – lead vocals, guitar
Lester Square – lead guitar, EDP Wasp synthesizer
Andy Warren – bass
J.D. Haney – drums
Additional musicians
Alvin Clark – keyboards
Technical
Alvin Clark – producer, engineer
The Monochrome Set – producer
Gill Thompson – cover illustration

References

External links 

 

The Monochrome Set albums
1980 albums